Genki Fujii (born 5 August 1952) is a Japanese political scientist.

Early life 
Fujii was born in Kitakoiwa, Edogawa, Tokyo.

Career 
Fujii sponsored Conservative Political Action Conference in 2021.

Fujii ran a video on his YouTube channel promoting a conspiracy theory that the American FBI extrajudicially arrested and killed or disappeared several men, their wives, and children for their political affiliation in June 2021. He offered no evidence or references and claims two unnamed American journalists told him.

References

External links 

 

Living people
1952 births
Japanese political scientists
Japanese international relations scholars